Young Wives' Tale, also known as Fun for Four, is a 1951 British comedy film directed by Henry Cass and starring Joan Greenwood, Nigel Patrick, Derek Farr, and Guy Middleton. The film is based on the 1949 play Young Wives' Tale by Ronald Jeans. It features one of Audrey Hepburn's earliest film roles, albeit a minor one, as Eve Lester.

Plot
During the post-World War II housing shortage, Bruce and Mary are a married couple who both have professional jobs and own their own house, and they let out rooms, including to another married couple, Rodney and Sabina, because Sabina is a friend of Mary. Both couples have an infant child, and the presence of a nanny for the two children exacerbates the problems caused by the crowding. Another young female lodger and Sabina's persistent old beau intensify the tensions.

Cast
 Joan Greenwood as Sabina Pennant
 Nigel Patrick as Rodney Pennant
 Derek Farr as Bruce Banning
 Guy Middleton as Victor Manifold
 Athene Seyler as Nanny Gallop
 Helen Cherry as Mary Banning
 Audrey Hepburn as Eve Lester
 Fabia Drake as Nanny Blott
 Irene Handl as Nanny
 Brian Oulton as Man in pub
 Joan Sanderson as Nurse

Critical reception
TV Guide noted "Broad humor is the order of the day," and rated the film 3/5 stars

References

External links 
 

1951 films
Films shot at Associated British Studios
1950s English-language films
Films directed by Henry Cass
Films set in London
British comedy films
1951 comedy films
British black-and-white films
British films based on plays
1950s British films